Peter G. Jordan is the President of Tarrant County College, a community college in Tarrant County, Texas. Formerly, he served as the Vice Chancellor of CUNY, as well as Vice President of Vaughn College of Aeronautics and Technology and Vice President of LaGuardia Community College. He was also a Dean at New York Institute of Technology, and a Dean at Adelphi University. He served as an Overseer and trustee for Colby College. He holds a bachelor's degree from Colby College, an M.S.C from Polytechnic Institute of New York University, and a Ph.D from the University of Pennsylvania.

References

Living people
Polytechnic Institute of New York University alumni
Year of birth missing (living people)